The Last Race is a 2022 Czech historical sport drama film directed by Tomáš Hodan. It tells story of Bohumil Hanč and Václav Vrbata who died during a 1913 race in Giant Mountains.

Cast
Kryštof Hádek as Bohumil Hanč
Marek Adamczyk as Emerich Rath
Oldřich Kaiser as old Emerich Rath
Judit Bárdos as Slavěna Hančová
Vladimír Pokorný as Václav Vrbata
Vladimír Javorský as Jan Buchar
Jan Hájek
Jaroslav Plesl as Josef Rössler-Ořovský
Jan Nedbal as Josef Feistauer
Cyril Dobrý as Karel Jarolímek
Jan Hofman as Josef Scheiner
Gabriela Pyšná
Bastian Beyer as Oswald Bartel
Zbyšek Humpolec
Simon Kirschner as Ingvald Smith-Kielland

References

External links
 
 The Last Race at CSFD.cz 

2022 films
2022 drama films
Czech historical drama films
2020s Czech-language films
2020s historical drama films
Czech sports drama films